There are other Adams Islands, including one more subantarctic island. See Adams Island (disambiguation) for other meanings.

Adams Island was discovered by the Western Base Party of the Australian Antarctic Expedition, 1911–1914, under Douglas Mawson, and named by him for the boatswain of the expedition ship Aurora.

References

See also 
 Composite Antarctic Gazetteer
 List of Antarctic and subantarctic islands
 SCAR
 Territorial claims in Antarctica

Islands of Queen Mary Land